Choristoneura orae, the spruce budworm, is a moth of the family Tortricidae. It is found in North America.

The wingspan is about 24 mm.

The larvae feed on Picea species.

References

Choristoneura